The 2010–11 Georgian Cup (also known as the David Kipiani Cup) was the sixty-seventh season overall and twenty-first since independence of the Georgian annual football tournament. The competition began on 24 August 2010 and ended on 26 May 2011. The defending champions were WIT Georgia, who won their first Georgian Cup last season.

Round of 32
These matches were played on 24 and 25 August 2010.

|}

Round of 16
The 12 winners from the previous round competed in this round, as well as the four teams that finished first, second, third and fourth in last year's Umaglesi Liga, Olimpi Rustavi, Dinamo Tbilisi, Zestafoni and WIT Georgia. These games was played on November 9, 2010.

|}

Quarterfinals
The eight winners from the previous round played in this round.

|}

First Legs

Second Legs

Semifinals
The four winners from the previous round played in this round.

|}

First Legs

Second Legs

Final

See also 
 2010–11 Umaglesi Liga
 2010–11 Pirveli Liga

External links
 Official site 
 goli.ge 
 es.geofootball.com  

Georgian Cup seasons
Cup
Georgian Cup